Raj Bhavan (translation: Government House) is the official residence of the governor of Haryana, India. It is located in the capital city of Haryana, Chandigarh where it faces Sukhna Lake.

See also
  Government Houses of the British Indian Empire

References

Buildings and structures in Chandigarh
Governors' houses in India
Government of Haryana